Christine Normandin (born April 30, 1984)  is a Canadian politician, who was first elected to the House of Commons of Canada in the 2019 election. She represents the electoral district of Saint-Jean as a member of the Bloc Québécois.

She was re-elected at the 2021 Canadian federal election.

Electoral record 

59,210
91,951

|-
 
|Liberal
|Filomena Rotiroti
|align="right"|16433
|align="right"|73.05
|align="right"|

|-

|Independent
|Katia Proulx
|align="right"|281
|align="right"|1.25
|align="right"|
|-

|-
|||||Total valid votes
|align="right"|22,497
|align="right"|98.57
|-
|||||Total rejected ballots
|align="right"|326
|align="right"|1.43
|-
|||||Turnout
|align="right"|22,823
|align="right"|46.95
|-
|||||Electors on the lists
|align="right"|48,609

References

External links

Living people
1984 births
Bloc Québécois MPs
Lawyers in Quebec
Members of the House of Commons of Canada from Quebec
Parti Québécois candidates in Quebec provincial elections
Politicians from Montreal
Women members of the House of Commons of Canada
21st-century Canadian politicians
21st-century Canadian women politicians